The Hitler and Mannerheim recording is a recording of a private conversation between Adolf Hitler, Führer of Nazi Germany, and Field Marshal Carl Gustaf Emil Mannerheim, Commander-in-Chief of the Finnish Defence Forces. It took place on a secret visit made to Finland by Hitler to honour Mannerheim's 75th birthday on 4 June 1942, during the Continuation War, a sub-theatre of World War II. Thor Damen, a sound engineer for the Finnish broadcaster Yleisradio (YLE) who had been assigned to record the official birthday proceedings, recorded the first eleven minutes of Hitler and Mannerheim's private conversation—without Hitler's knowledge. It is the only known recording of Hitler speaking in an unofficial tone.

Visit by Hitler 

In June 1941, Nazi Germany invaded the Soviet Union. Despite the initial and overwhelming success of the campaign, the Soviets repulsed the German assault on Moscow and stalled the German advance. Hitler required his allies  including Finland, which was repelling its second Soviet invasion in two years  to tie down as much of the enormous Soviet military machine as possible. 

In 1942, Hitler, under extreme secrecy, visited Finland, officially to congratulate Mannerheim on his 75th birthday. Mannerheim did not wish to greet Hitler at his headquarters, as it would have appeared like a state visit. Therefore, the meeting occurred at Imatra in southern Finland. At Immola Airfield, Hitler was greeted and accompanied by President Risto Ryti and Finnish officials to Mannerheim's personal train, where a birthday meal and negotiations took place.

Recording 

After the official greetings and speeches had taken place, Hitler and Mannerheim, accompanied by other German and Finnish officials, entered Mannerheim's private wagon for cigars, drinks and lunch. In this wagon, a large and visible microphone had been set up by Thor Damen, a sound engineer for the Finnish broadcaster Yleisradio (YLE), who had been assigned to record Hitler's official speech and birthday message to Mannerheim.

After the official speeches, Damen continued to record the now-private conversation, with Hitler unaware that the conversation was still being recorded. After eleven minutes, Hitler's SS guards realized what Damen was doing and made a cutthroat gesture to demand that he cease recording. The SS guards demanded the tape be destroyed, but YLE was allowed to keep the tape in a sealed container with the promise that it never be opened again. The tape was given to the head of the State Censors' Office, Kustaa Vilkuna, returned to YLE in 1957, and made publicly available a few years later. It is the only known recording of Hitler speaking in an unofficial tone and one of the very few recordings in which Hitler may be heard delivering a narrative without raising his voice.

The conversation
While the official reason for Hitler's visit – which had been arranged just the day before – was to celebrate Mannerheim's birthday, Hitler's actual purpose was to ensure that Finland would remain allied to Nazi Germany by reiterating the dangers of Bolshevism, thereby preventing any Finnish feelers to either the Soviets or to the Western Allies. Hitler wanted to reassure himself that he had the Finns' continuing support.

On the tape, Hitler dominated the discussion, with others at the table – Mannerheim, Ryti and Generalfeldmarschall Wilhelm Keitel – mostly silent. He discussed the failure of Operation Barbarossa, Italian defeats in Africa, the invasions of Yugoslavia and Greece, his surprise at the Soviet Union's ability to produce thousands of tanks, and his strategic concerns about Romanian petroleum wells. Hitler was at pains to present German policy as having been consistent throughout, but also emphasized that imminent Russian aggression had given him no choice but to attack the Soviets.

Aside from this broad summary of the war in the East, Hitler did not reveal any of his future military plans, specifically an upcoming German offensive, which the Finns were informed of only the day before it occurred. Despite Hitler's visit and monologue, and a return visit from Mannerheim, the Nazis' continuing military crisis over the next six months would provoke the Finns into looking for a way out of their alliance with Germany.

Authenticity 
After the tape was revealed to the public, some believed it was a fake because Hitler's voice sounded too soft. After listening to the recording, Rochus Misch, Hitler's former bodyguard and radio operator, said: "He is speaking normally, but I have problems with the tone; the intonation isn't quite right. Sometimes it seems okay, but at other points not. I have the feeling it's someone mimicking Hitler. It really sounds as if someone is mimicking him." Photographs taken on the day of the event showed that Hitler had been drinking alcohol, which could have affected his voice, as he rarely drank. Specialists from postwar Germany's Federal Criminal Police Office later examined the tape, and Head of Frequencies Stefan Gfroerer declared that it is "very obvious to us that this is Hitler's voice."

In popular culture 
 Mannerheim's saloon coach, where the meeting with Hitler took place, is displayed outside a Shell service station on Finnish national road 12 in Sastamala, Pirkanmaa. It has been open to the public since 1969. The private wagon, where the recording took place, is located in Mikkeli. It is open to the public only once a year, on 4 June, Mannerheim's birthday. 

 The recording was used by Swiss actor Bruno Ganz when he rehearsed Hitler's manner of speaking for his role in the 2004 film Downfall.

See also 
 Diplomatic history of World War II
 Hitler Stalingrad Speech
 Hitler's Table Talk
 Mannerheim (family)

References
Notes

Bibliography

External links

 Yleisradio article on the recording, including a full copy of it

1942 in Finland
Adolf Hitler
Carl Gustaf Emil Mannerheim
Continuation War
Diplomatic visits
Finland in World War II
Imatra
June 1942 events